Laliteshwar Prasad Shahi (1 October 1920 – 9 June 2018) was an Indian politician of Indian National Congress from Bihar. He was born on 1 October 1920 to Yogendra Prasad Shahi and his wife. He had three brothers, Nanki Prasad Shahi, Bhuvneshwar Prasad Shahi and Vijeshwar Prasad Shahi. He has a known grandson named Santoshi Kumar. He was the Member of the Legislative Assembly between 1980 and 1985 from Lalganj, Vaishali, defeating Jai Narain Prasad Nishad. In 1984, he became Member of Parliament from Muzaffarpur and became the Education & Culture Minister in the Indian Government. His son Hemant Kumar Shahi was Member of Legislative Assembly from Vaishali. His daughter-in-law Veena Shahi is a former MLA and co-operative minister of Bihar. Shahi died on 9 June 2018 after a prolonged illness.

References

1920 births
2018 deaths
Lok Sabha members from Bihar
Bihar MLAs 1980–1985
India MPs 1984–1989
Indian National Congress politicians from Bihar
People from Muzaffarpur district